The 1963–64 season of the European Cup Winners' Cup club football tournament was won by Sporting CP in a replayed final victory against MTK Budapest.

First round 

|}
Bye: Tottenham Hotspur , Motor Zwickau , Linfield F.C. 

1 Olympiacos beat Zagłębie Sosnowiec 2–0 in a play-off to qualify for the Second round.

2 Sporting CP beat Atalanta 3–1 after extra time in a play-off to qualify for the Second round.

3 Dinamo Zagreb played Linzer ASK in play-off that finished 1–1. Dinamo Zagreb won a coin toss to qualify for the Second round.

First leg

Second leg

Play-off

Second round 

|}

1 Hamburger SV beat Barcelona 3–2 in a play-off to qualify for the Quarter-finals.

First leg

Second leg

Playoff

Quarter-finals 

|}

1 MTK Budapest beat Fenerbahçe 2–0 in a play-off to qualify for the Semifinals.

First leg

Second leg

Playoff

Semi-finals 

|}

1 Sporting CP beat Olympique Lyonnais 1–0 in a play-off to qualify for the Final.

First leg

Second leg

Play-off

Final

Replay

See also 
 1963–64 European Cup
 1963–64 Inter-Cities Fairs Cup

External links 

 1963-64 competition at UEFA website
 Cup Winners' Cup results at Rec.Sport.Soccer Statistics Foundation
  Cup Winners Cup Seasons 1963-64–results, protocols 
 website Football Archive  1963–64 Cup Winners Cup

Europa
UEFA Cup Winners' Cup seasons